The 1993 Saskatchewan Roughriders season was the 79th season in the club's 83rd year of existence. The team finished in 3rd place in the Canadian Football League's West Division with an 11–7 record. 

Notably, the 1993 Roughriders became the first team to lose to an American-based CFL team following their week 4 loss to the expansion Sacramento Gold Miners. The team had played the Gold Miners on the road with just three days of rest and would win 10 of their next 14 games following that loss. The Roughriders qualified for the playoffs, but lost the West Semi-Final game to the Edmonton Eskimos.

Offseason

CFL Draft

Preseason

Regular season

Season Standings

Season schedule

Postseason

Schedule

Awards and records 
 CFL's Most Outstanding Defensive Player Award – Jearld Baylis (DT)

1993 CFL All-Stars

Offence 
 SB – Ray Elgaard

Defence 
 DT – Jearld Baylis
 CB – Barry Wilburn
 DS – Glen Suitor

Special teams 
 K – Dave Ridgway

1993 Western All-Stars

Offence 
 SB – Ray Elgaard
 WR – Don Narcisse

Defence 
 DT – Jearld Baylis
 CB – Barry Wilburn
 DS – Glen Suitor

Special teams 
 K – Dave Ridgway

References 

Saskatchewan Roughriders seasons
1993 Canadian Football League season by team
1993 in Saskatchewan